Tinkers Green Halt railway station was a station in Oswestry, Shropshire, England. The station was opened on 16 October 1939 and closed on 18 January 1965.

References

Further reading

Disused railway stations in Shropshire
Railway stations in Great Britain opened in 1939
Railway stations in Great Britain closed in 1965
Former Great Western Railway stations
Beeching closures in England